The Soviet football championship was composed of professional teams that were known as "teams of masters".

The first professional football competitions in the Soviet Union started in 1936. The format of Soviet football championship was not consisted and was changing almost every year.

Officially professional sports in the Soviet Union was prohibited as any other private form of business. As anything else in the country, football also was controlled by Soviet government and the Communist Party of the Soviet Union. The best "teams of masters" were Dynamo controlled by Soviet secret police, Army and Armed Forces clubs, and Spartak which officially represented "industrial cooperation" but was actually directed by the young communists of Komsomol. Following the so-called "liberation of Europe by the Red Army" in 1944–45, numerous Dynamos, CSKA, and Spartaks were set up in countries of the Warsaw Pact. These teams were also instantaneously created with occupation of eastern Poland, Baltics and eastern Romania in 1939–1940.

Officially all footballers were employed because unemployment was illegal. So, footballers were playing football, while on the books working and getting paid as a regular worker. Unlike professional athletes in the West who were becoming rich celebrities, in the Soviet Union notable sports athletes were transitioning to their new career as an "apparatchik", or Communist official, whether in coaching or administrative positions.

Teams of masters

References

External links
 Bob Oates. Sports in Soviet Union Only for Elite : There Are Top Athletes, and Then There Are Those Who Sunbathe and Watch Drawbridges Go Up. Los Angeles Times. July 22, 1986
 Чемпионат СССР, высшая лига. Суммарная таблица за все годы. wildstat.ru
 Чемпионат СССР, первая лига. Суммарная таблица за все годы. wildstat.ru
 Чемпионат СССР, вторая лига. Суммарная таблица за все годы. wildstat.ru

Football in the Soviet Union
Soviet Union
Football